Joge-e (上下絵) are special playful images that were often created in the Meiji era in Japan. These images can be viewed from the top, or the bottom. Each viewing angle enables the viewer to see a different image.

External links
Two Way Pictures

Ukiyo-e genres